John Martin Reservoir is a reservoir on the Arkansas River in southeastern Colorado. Built and managed by the U.S. Army Corps of Engineers, it is used for flood control, irrigation, and recreation. John Martin Reservoir State Park lies on its shore.

History
In the 1930s, U.S. Representative from Colorado John Martin successfully advocated for legislation in the U.S. Congress approving the building of a reservoir on the Arkansas River for the purposes of flood control. Signed into law in 1939 by President Roosevelt, the legislation assigned the task of construction to the U.S. Army Corps of Engineers.

Construction of Caddoa Dam and Reservoir started in the fall of 1939. Rep. Martin died that year, and, in June 1940, both the dam and reservoir were renamed in his honor. Storage of water in the reservoir began in January 1943. The diversion of resources to fighting World War II caused delays in the project until 1946. The dam was finally completed in October 1948.

In 1935 the U.S. Army Corps established the Tucumcari District to develop the Conchas Project in Eastern New Mexico. At the conclusion of the construction of the Conchas Project the focus of the District moved to Caddoa, Colorado to construct the Caddoa Reservoir Project. The District staff relocated to Caddoa Colorado on December 4, 1939. At this time the District name was changed to the Caddoa District. In 1942 with the advent of World War Two the District made its final move to Albuquerque, New Mexico and was renamed the Albuquerque District which has remained the same since. At this time the focus of the district switched from Civil Works to Wartime activities which included work to facilitate the development of Los Alamos Laboratory and their development of atomic energy and its application to weapons.

In December 1948, the state governments of Colorado and Kansas signed the Arkansas River Compact, an agreement governing the two states' access to the river's water, including John Martin Reservoir. In 1980, the states developed a plan allocating 60% of the reservoir's water to Colorado and 40% to Kansas. Adherence to the Compact has been a recurrent source of controversy between the two states, serving as a primary factor in the decades-long water conflict litigation Kansas v. Colorado.

Geography

It lies in southeastern Colorado in the Colorado Piedmont region of the Great Plains. The entirety of the reservoir lies within Bent County.

The reservoir is impounded at its eastern end by John Martin Dam. The Arkansas River is both the reservoir's primary inflow from the west and outflow to the east. Smaller tributaries include Rule Creek, which flows into the reservoir from the south, and Gageby Creek, which flows in from the north.

U.S. Route 50 runs generally east-west north of the reservoir. Colorado State Highway 183 runs north-south between U.S. 50 and Fort Lyon immediately northwest of the reservoir. A BNSF Railway line runs generally east-west along the reservoir's southern shoreline, crossing the southern arm fed by Rule Creek.

Caddoa, also unincorporated, lies immediately east of the dam.

Climate

According to the Köppen Climate Classification system, John Martin Dam has a cold semi-arid climate, abbreviated "BSk" on climate maps. The  reading is the highest reliably measured temperature ever recorded in the state of Colorado.

Hydrography
The surface area, surface elevation, and water volume of the reservoir fluctuate based on inflow and local climatic conditions. In terms of capacity, the Corps of Engineers vertically divides the reservoir into a set of pools based on volume and water level, and the reservoir is considered full when filled to the capacity of its recreation and conservation pool.

Since the reservoir's initial flooding, sedimentation has gradually accumulated on the reservoir bottom thus raising its elevation.

Infrastructure

A portion of the dam's midsection is a concrete spillway controlled by 16 radial gates which empty into the Arkansas River.

Management
The Albuquerque District of the U.S. Army Corps of Engineers manages both the dam and the reservoir for the purposes of flood control and irrigation. Colorado Parks and Wildlife manages the reservoir surface and all recreational activities at the reservoir including John Martin Reservoir State Park. The agency also oversees  adjoining the park as the John Martin Reservoir State Wildlife Area.

Parks and recreation

John Martin Reservoir State Park is located on the north shore of the reservoir's eastern end, and it extends east to include the area immediately below the dam. The park hosts boat ramps, camping facilities, a hiking trail, and wetland habitats. Below the dam is a small reservoir named Lake Hasty which includes a swimming beach.

John Martin Reservoir is open for sport fishing. Hunting is forbidden in the state park but permitted in the neighboring wildlife area.

Points of interest
A preserved  section of the Santa Fe Trail lies north of the reservoir, commemorated by a historical marker placed by the Daughters of the American Revolution.

Fort Lyon National Cemetery is located immediately west of the reservoir.

Wildlife
John Martin Reservoir is a productive warm water fishery, providing species including saugeye, wiper, white bass, crappie, and catfish. These fish are stocked as needed.

With 373 documented species of birds in Bent County, John Martin Reservoir is considered a premier birding area. Additionally, during winter months, bald eagles can be found throughout the area. During the winter of 2001-2002, 126 eagles were documented.

Other wildlife common in the area include deer, prairie dogs, rabbits, raccoons, and squirrels.

See also
List of largest reservoirs of Colorado

References

External links
John Martin Reservoir, U.S. Army Corps of Engineers
John Martin Reservoir State Park, Colorado Parks & Wildlife
John Martin Reservoir State Wildlife Area, Colorado Parks & Wildlife

Reservoirs in Colorado
Bodies of water of Bent County, Colorado